Bat boy or batboy or variation, may refer to:

 Batboy, a nickname for a US Army airborne ranger assigned to the 75th Ranger Regiment originating from the period prior to the organization of the Ranger regiment in 1984 when there were only two independent Ranger Battalions
 Boy serving as a batman, particularly in the British army in colonial period India
 Batboy, a person who carries bats for a baseball team
 Batsboy, a boy batter (baseball)
 Batsboy, a boy batter (cricket)
 The Batboy (2010), a novel about a batboy, by Mike Lupica
 Bat Boy (character), a fictional creature who made many appearances in the defunct supermarket tabloid Weekly World News
 Bat Boy: The Musical, a musical based on the Bat Boy character
 "Bat Boy and Rubin!" (Mad #8, Dec. 1953 – Jan. 1954), Kurtzman/Wallace Wood parody of Batman and Robin
 a boy vampire
 a male bat (Chiroptera)

See also

Batkid Miles Scott, cancer survivor and subject of 2015 documentary Batkid Begins
Boy (disambiguation)
Bat (disambiguation)
 
 
 Batman (disambiguation)
 Batgirl (disambiguation)
 Batwoman (disambiguation)
 Batter (disambiguation)